Timeline of anthropology, 1980–1989

Events
1984
"Turkana Boy" is discovered
1986
The Human Genome Project is launched
1989
The National Museum of the American Indian is founded in the U.S.

Publications
1980
Negara: The Theatre State in Nineteenth-Century Bali, by Clifford Geertz
The Devil and Commodity Fetishism in South America, by Michael Taussig
1981
In Vain I Tried To Tell You: Essays in Native American Ethnopoetics, by Dell Hymes
Nisa: The Life and Words of a Kung Woman, by Marjorie Shostak
1982
Europe and the People Without History by Eric Wolf
1983
Local Knowledge: further essays in interpretive anthropology by Clifford Geertz
1984
Muelos: A Stone Age Superstition about Sexuality, by Weston La Barre
1985
Sweetness And Power : The Place Of Sugar In Modern History, by Sidney Mintz
1986
Writing Culture, ed. by James Clifford and George E. Marcus
1988
Donald Brown's Hierarchy, History, and Human Nature was published.
1989
Our Kind: Who We Are, Where We Came From, Where We Are Going, by Marvin Harris

Births

Deaths
1980
Gregory Bateson
Johanes Nicolaisen

1981
Carleton Coon
Marvin Opler

1983
Meyer Fortes
Herge Kleivan
Carobeth Laird
Victor Turner
1984
Michel Foucault
Audrey Richards
1985
Karl-Gustav Izikowitz
George Peter Murdock
Barbara Myerhoff
1986
Morton Fried
Elman Service
1989
Edmund Leach

Awards
1980
Margaret Mead Award: Brigitte Jordan

1981
Margaret Mead Award: Nancy Scheper-Hughes
1984
Margaret Mead Award: Sue E. Erstoff
1985
Margaret Mead Award: Susan C.M. Scrimshaw
1986
Margaret Mead Award: Jill Korbin
1989
Margaret Mead Award: Mark Nichter

Anthropology by decade
Anthropology
Anthropology timelines
1980s decade overviews